Radivoje Živković (born 11 October 1950), sometimes also Radivoj, is a retired Serbian professional basketball player.

Playing career

Borac Čačak 
Živković played for Borac Čačak from the 1968–69 to  the 1971–72 season.

Crvena zvezda 
In 1972, Živković signed for Crvena zvezda of the Yugoslav First League. Due to strong transfer regulations he missed entire 1972–73 season. He made his Yugoslav League debut for Crvena zvezda on 10 November 1973 in a win against OKK Beograd. 

He was a member of the 1973–74 Zvezda selection that won the 1974 FIBA European Cup Winners' Cup. He appeared in 203 games for the Zvezda during seven seasons and scored 2,838 points (13.9 PPG). Živković finished his professional career in 1981.

National team career 
Živković was a member of the Yugoslavia national junior team that finished 4th at the 1970 European Championship for Junior Men in Athens, Greece. Over seven tournament games, he averaged 5.9 points per game.

Živković was a member of the Yugoslavian national team that won the gold medal at the 1975 Mediterranean Games in Algeria.

Career achievements 
 FIBA European Cup Winners' Cup winner: 1 (with Crvena zvezda: 1973–74).
 Yugoslav Cup winner: 1 (with Crvena zvezda: 1974–75).

See also 
 List of KK Crvena zvezda players with 100 games played

References

1950 births
Living people
Basketball players from Čačak
Centers (basketball)
Competitors at the 1975 Mediterranean Games
KK Borac Čačak players
KK Crvena zvezda players
Mediterranean Games gold medalists for Yugoslavia
Serbian men's basketball players
Yugoslav men's basketball players
Mediterranean Games medalists in basketball